Khaliquzzaman M. Elias is a Bangladeshi writer. He won Bangla Academy Literary Award in 2011 in the translation category. He is currently serving as a faculty member of the Department of English and modern Languages at North South University.

Education and career
Elias completed his master's from the University of Dhaka in 1973. He earned his PhD from Howard University in 1989.

Awards
 Bangladesh Shishu Academy Award (1984)
 Bangla Academy Literary Award (2011)

References

Living people
University of Dhaka alumni
Howard University alumni
Bangladeshi translators
Recipients of Bangla Academy Award
Date of birth missing (living people)
Place of birth missing (living people)
Year of birth missing (living people)

3. Youths should develop reading habit 
https://www.newagebd.net/article/164226/youths-should-develop-reading-habit-khaliquzzaman-elias

4.অনুবাদ এক স্বতন্ত্র সত্তা
https://bangla.bdnews24.com/arts/16828

5.যা ভালো লাগে তা করতে পারার আনন্দই 'আশীর্বাদের পথে চলা'

https://samakal.com/feature/article/2207124037/%E0%A6%AF%E0%A6%BE-%E0%A6%AD%E0%A6%BE%E0%A6%B2%E0%A7%8B-%E0%A6%B2%E0%A6%BE%E0%A6%97%E0%A7%87-%E0%A6%A4%E0%A6%BE-%E0%A6%95%E0%A6%B0%E0%A6%A4%E0%A7%87-%E0%A6%AA%E0%A6%BE%E0%A6%B0%E0%A6%BE%E0%A6%B0-%E0%A6%86%E0%A6%A8%E0%A6%A8%E0%A7%8D%E0%A6%A6%E0%A6%87-%E0%A6%86%E0%A6%B6%E0%A7%80%E0%A6%B0%E0%A7%8D%E0%A6%AC%E0%A6%BE%E0%A6%A6%E0%A7%87%E0%A6%B0-%E0%A6%AA%E0%A6%A5%E0%A7%87-%E0%A6%9A%E0%A6%B2%E0%A6%BE